Andrew Lauderdale (born November 22, 1993) is an American football offensive tackle for the Saskatchewan Roughriders of the Canadian Football League (CFL). He played college football at New Hampshire, and was signed by the New Orleans Saints as an undrafted free agent in 2017.

Professional career

New Orleans Saints
Lauderdale was signed by the New Orleans Saints after going undrafted in the 2017 NFL Draft. He was waived by the Saints on May 15, 2017.

San Francisco 49ers
On June 9, 2017, Lauderdale signed a two-year contract with the San Francisco 49ers. He was waived on September 1, 2017. He was re-signed to the 49ers' practice squad on November 6, 2017. He signed a reserve/future contract with the 49ers on January 2, 2018.

On September 1, 2018, Lauderdale was waived by the 49ers.

Buffalo Bills
On December 5, 2018, Lauderdale was signed to the Buffalo Bills practice squad.

Arizona Hotshots
On January 8, 2019, Lauderdale was signed by the Arizona Hotshots of the Alliance of American Football.

Arizona Cardinals
After the AAF suspended football operations, Lauderdale signed with the Arizona Cardinals on April 8, 2019. He was waived on June 6, 2019.

Jacksonville Jaguars
On June 7, 2019, Lauderdale was claimed off waivers by the Jacksonville Jaguars. He was waived on August 11, 2019.

San Francisco 49ers (second stint)
On August 21, 2019, Lauderdale was signed by the San Francisco 49ers. He was waived with an injury designation on August 31, 2019. He reverted to injured reserve the next day. He became an unrestricted free agent following the season but did not sign a contract tender.

Saskatchewan Roughriders
On January 22, 2021, Lauderdale was signed by the Saskatchewan Roughriders in the Canadian Football League (CFL). He made his CFL debut in week two of the season, replacing Brett Boyko. He injured his ankle in week 7 and missed the following two games. He was named starter prior to their week 10 matchup against the Calgary Stampeders.

References

External links
New Hampshire Wildcats bio

1993 births
Living people
American football offensive tackles
Arizona Cardinals players
Arizona Hotshots players
Jacksonville Jaguars players
New Hampshire Wildcats football players
New Orleans Saints players
Players of American football from New Hampshire
San Francisco 49ers players
Saskatchewan Roughriders players
Sportspeople from Concord, New Hampshire